Beaucarnea gracilis is an attractive member of the subfamily Nolinaceae of the family Asparagaceae native to partial-desert areas in Mexico. Its name "gracilis", meaning "slender", is misleading, as its trunk is especially bulbous. It was formerly known as Nolina gracilis.

Description 
As a seedling, B. gracilis grows as a tiny, bark-covered ball of succulent "trunk", growing tufts of long, extremely narrow leaves. In habitat, this forms a ground rosette of over 3 feet in diameter. The trunk becomes extremely large and grows a sparse coverage of short and sparsely branching branches which can grow up to 20–23 feet. Thick tufts of leaves of up to 3.3 feet long and 0.4-0.8 inches long grow along the tops of these branches. The flowers are tiny, yellow and white and grow in vast numbers, but only on very old individuals.

Cultivation 
B. gracilis is extremely easy to cultivate, growing rapidly in even very inhospitable environments and pots, and thus makes an excellent pot plant, willing to grow happily in a wide range of indoor settings. It prefers sandy soil, sunny position and infrequent watering, and does well in a cool wintering.

References 

The Complete Encyclopedia of Succulents by Zdenek Jezek and Libor Kunte

gracilis
Caudiciform plants
Taxa named by Charles Antoine Lemaire
Endemic flora of Mexico
Flora of Puebla
Flora of Oaxaca